The 2019-20 Wisconsin Badgers men's ice hockey season was the 71st season of play for the program and the 20th season in the Big Ten Conference. The Badgers represented the University of Wisconsin–Madison and were coached by Tony Granato, in his 4th season.

Roster

As of August 16, 2019.

Standings

Schedule and Results

|-
!colspan=12 style=";" | Regular Season

|-
!colspan=12 style=";" | 

|- align="center" bgcolor="#e0e0e0"
|colspan=12|Wisconsin Lost Series 0–2

Scoring Statistics

Goaltending statistics

Rankings

Players drafted into the NHL

2020 NHL Entry Draft

† incoming freshman

References

External links

Wisconsin Badgers men's ice hockey seasons
Wisconsin Badgers 
Wisconsin Badgers 
Wisconsin Badgers 
Wisconsin Badgers